Aari Arujunan, known by the mononym Aari, is an Indian actor who has appeared in Tamil language films. He made his lead debut in Rettaisuzhi (2010) produced by director Shankar, before having a breakthrough performance as Murugan in Nedunchaalai (2014) and starring in the supernatural thriller Maya. In 2021, he emerged as the title winner of the Tamil reality television show Bigg Boss Tamil Season 4.

Career
Aari, before entering films, had background in theatre featuring in productions by Magic Lantern, Theatre Nisha and Inland Theatres. He appeared in a minor role in Alaiyadikkuthu (2005) and was later cast in the role of Muthu in Aadum Koothu (2006). Aari made his lead debut in Rettaisuzhi, produced by director Shankar. He appeared as Murthy, an army man, returning to his village.

In October 2011 it was announced that Aari would feature in Maalai Pozhudhin Mayakathilaey and would star alongside winner of Miss South India 2010, Shubha Phutela. Aari mentioned that it was "really challenging to play an ordinary guy", as he had to consciously keep his emotions to a minimum at all times.

Aari portrayed the lead role in N. Krishna's third venture, a romantic road trip film titled Nedunchaalai (2014), a period film set in the 1980, which took two years to complete. Post-release, a critic noted "Aari immerses himself in the central character of Murugan with such conviction and controlled flair that it becomes impossible to separate the actor from the part". The film opened to positive reviews. His following venture, the comedy Kadai Enn 6, remains unreleased. Another venture Dharani directed by newcomer Guhan Sambandham, released in 2015, which did not perform well. In the same year he played a pivotal role in Maya, supernatural thriller alongside Nayanthara. Maya was a huge success at the box office and was critically acclaimed. He was again cast in a lead role in N.Krishna's next venture, Maane Thene Paeye, a romantic comedy opposite Subhashree Ganguly, which was dropped halfway. In 2016, he was seen in Unnodu Ka, a commercial entertainer opposite to Maya, which performed average in the box office. Later, he was cast in horror comedy Nagesh Thirayarangam in lead role opposite Ashna Zaveri. His next ventures to be released include Ellam Mele Irukkuruvan Pathuppan, a sci fi movie with alien backdrop, then Aleka, a romantic thriller, Bagavan mythological drama and an action thriller titled TN-43. He has also been roped in to play a significant role in Nenjuku Needhi, alongside Udhayanidhi Stalin directed by Arunraja Kamaraj, the official remake of critically acclaimed Hindi film Article 15.

In January 2021, he emerged as the title winner in the reality show Bigg Boss Tamil 4.

After Big boss Tamil he acted a movie name called Nenjukukku Needhi (Article 15 Tamil Version″).

Personal life
Aari was born in Palani, Tamil Nadu.He married Nathiya (Sri Lankan) - UK citizen and HR Manager Chennai on 18 November 2015 and the reception was held on 19 November 2015 in Taj Connemara.The couple has one child named Riya.

He is also a body sculptor and fitness coach, who has mentored actors Cheran, Ameer, Sasikumar, Parthiban, Jiiva, Aadhi Pinisetty, etc.

As a social activist, he has supported Tamil culture, language and agriculture. In 2018, he started a '' (Tamil Signature) movement where he wanted all the Tamil people to sign documents in Tamil script. He holds the Guinness Book of World Records for most signatures on a whiteboard. He also holds the Guinness World Record for planting approximately 30,000 seedlings with 20,000 participants, in a 15-acre land, in collaboration with Sathyabama University. In 2017 he actively participated in Jallikattu protests held in Marina beach, Chennai.

Filmography

Film

Television

Awards

References

21st-century Indian male actors
Living people
Male actors in Tamil cinema
1986 births
People from Dindigul district
Bigg Boss (Tamil TV series) contestants
Big Brother (franchise) winners